Mišljen (ca. 1330) was a Serbian nobleman that served king Stefan Dečanski (r. 1321–31), with the title of veliki tepčija. The title-holder took care of the royal estates. He was wealthy. In 1330 he had a monastery dedicated to the Holy Apostles built somewhere in eastern Hum. He restored the church, donated books, vestments and gold, and built himself an adorned tomb. This church is located in the village of Crkvina, 6 km from Goražde (in Bosnia and Herzegovina). The menologion written on demand of veliki tepčija Obrad (fl. 1230s) is recorded to have later came into the possession of Radoslava, "the wife of the tepčija", presumably of Mišljen.

References

Sources

 

14th-century Serbian nobility
People of the Kingdom of Serbia (medieval)
14th-century deaths
13th-century births
Tepčija
Medieval Serbian magnates
History of the Serbs of Bosnia and Herzegovina
Medieval Herzegovina